La Ville-Dieu-du-Temple is a commune in the Tarn-et-Garonne department in the Occitanie region in southern France.  It is served by La Ville-Dieu station on the Bordeaux-Toulouse line.

See also
Communes of the Tarn-et-Garonne department

References

Communes of Tarn-et-Garonne